Les Aventures de Till L'Espiègle is a French-East German film, based on The Legend of Thyl Ulenspiegel and Lamme Goedzak. It was released in 1956.

Cast
 Gérard Philipe: Till Eulenspiegel
 Jean Vilar: The Duke of Alva
 Fernand Ledoux: Claes
 Nicole Berger: Nele
 Jean Carmet: Lamme Goedzak
 Jean Debucourt: The cardinal.
 Erwin Geschonneck: Bras d'Acier
 Wilhelm Koch-Hooge: William the Silent
 Elfriede Florin: Soetkin

References

External links
 

1956 films
1956 adventure films
French adventure films
East German films
1950s French-language films
Films set in the 16th century
Films set in Flanders
Films based on Belgian novels
Cultural depictions of William the Silent
Cultural depictions of Fernando Álvarez de Toledo, 3rd Duke of Alba
Till Eulenspiegel
Works about the Eighty Years' War
Adaptations of works by Charles De Coster
1950s French films